Kiezgeschichten is an East German television series.

See also
List of German television series

External links
 

1987 German television series debuts
1987 German television series endings
Television shows set in Berlin
German-language television shows
Television in East Germany